Bjarni Jónsson (born 31 May 1965) is an Icelandic former footballer who played as a midfielder. He spent the majority of his playing career with KA, making more than 200 league appearances for the club, but also had a short spell with Stjarnan. In 1990, Bjarni won two caps for the Iceland national football team; he made his debut in the 4–0 win against Bermuda on 3 April and made his second and final appearance in the 1–4 defeat to the United States five days later.

References

Bjarni Jónsson international appearances at ksi.is

1965 births
Living people
Bjarni Jonsson
Association football midfielders
Bjarni Jonsson
Bjarni Jonsson
Bjarni Jonsson